"Green Limousine" is a song by Australian rock and pop band the Badloves and released in December 1993 as the third single from the band's debut studio album Get On Board. The song peaked at number 35 on the Australian ARIA Charts in January 1994.

On the album liner notes, the band says "This song offers a wry comment on the willingness of certain celebrities to jump on the bandwagon of any fashionable cause. Doffing their collective caps to the traditions of 60s soul, the band took 12 hours to record the piece... it started as a pop, soul thing and we progressively stripped it back."

Track listing
CD single (D11611)
 "Green Limousine" - 3:48	
 "For What it's Worth" - 3:24	
 "Yesterday's Gone" - 5:38	
 "Sugar Daddy" - 5:29	
 "I Embarrass Myself" - 3:40

Charts

References

1993 songs
1993 singles
The Badloves songs
Mushroom Records singles